George Dimmitt Memorial Hospital, also known as the Polk Community Hospital and Lakeshores Residential Center, is a historic hospital building located at Humansville, Polk County, Missouri.  It was built in 1929, and is a Colonial Revival style brick building consisting of a three-story central portion flanked by two-story wings with gallery porches. The building incorporates an existing two-story brick residence with an ell. It features a wide frieze and cornice rendered in terra cotta.  The building houses a residential care center for individuals with psychiatric or developmental disabilities.

It was listed on the National Register of Historic Places in 2012.

References

Hospital buildings on the National Register of Historic Places in Missouri
Colonial Revival architecture in Missouri
Hospital buildings completed in 1929
Buildings and structures in Polk County, Missouri
National Register of Historic Places in Polk County, Missouri